Maïmouna Togola (born 7 January 1991) is a Malian footballer. She has been a member of the Mali women's national team.

International career
Togola capped for Mali at senior level during the 2014 Africa Women Cup of Nations qualification.

References

1991 births
Living people
Malian women's footballers
Mali women's international footballers
21st-century Malian people
Women's association footballers not categorized by position